The Batang Baram Bridge or ASEAN Bridge is the longest bridge in Miri Division, Sarawak, Malaysia.  The bridge is located along Miri-Baram Highway (Federal Route ). The ASEAN Bridge is located approximately 2 km upstream of the New Miri Port Complex.  The bridge and access road directly link Sarawak with Brunei across the Batang Baram via the existing Immigration Checkpoint at Sungai Tujuh.

Construction of the ASEAN Bridge and access road commenced on 17 January 2001 and was completed in August 2003. The bridge is designed in accordance with the latest British Standard BS 5400.  The bridge has 19 spans with a total of 1040 meters.

Toll rates 
Beginning 1 June 2015, the bridge were becoming toll free for local users.

References

Bridges in Sarawak
Bridges completed in 2003
Toll bridges in Malaysia
Box girder bridges